Rimantė Jonušaitė (born 25 October 2003) is a Lithuanian footballer who plays as a forward for A.C. Milan in the Serie A and has appeared for the Lithuania women's national team.

Career
Jonušaitė has been capped for the Lithuania national team, appearing for the team during the UEFA Women's Euro 2021 qualifying cycle.

References

External links
 
 

2003 births
Living people
People from Mažeikiai
Women's association football forwards
Lithuanian women's footballers
Lithuania women's international footballers
Gintra Universitetas players
A.C. Milan Women players